"Under Cover of Darkness" is a song by American rock band The Strokes. The single served as the lead single for their fourth studio album, Angles, and was released online on February 9, 2011 as a free download for 48 hours exclusively. It was the first single release from the band in five years, following the release of "You Only Live Once" in 2006. "Under Cover of Darkness" received positive reviews, managing to reach BBC Radio 1's A Playlist; before going on to debut at number 47 on the respective chart.  In October 2011, NME placed it at number 133 on its list "150 Best Tracks of the Past 15 Years".

Music video
The music video for the song was released on March 2, 2011. The video was directed and produced by Warren Fu at Loew's Jersey Theatre in Jersey City, New Jersey on February 17, 2011. The video begins with a clip of the music video for "You Only Live Once", and contains a reference to the song "Last Nite". The reference occurs when Julian Casablancas throws his microphone stand (which he also did in the video for "Last Nite") while stating that "everybody's singing the same song for 10 years." This led some to believe he was talking about the longevity of arguably the band's most popular single. However, in a 2014 interview, Casablancas stated that this line was an opinion of the music business essentially churning out the same old pop music without ever innovating, and not a reference to The Strokes or any particular band.

Commercial performance
"Under Cover of Darkness" is the third most successful single in the band's discography. It peaked at number 12 on Billboard's Alternative Songs chart and charted a total of 17 weeks.

In popular culture
"Under Cover Of Darkness" was made available for download on July 24, 2012 to play in Rock Band 3 Basic and PRO mode utilizing real guitar / bass guitar, and MIDI compatible electronic drum kits / keyboards. It appears on the setlist for Rocksmith which was released in October, 2011 in North America. The song is also featured on the soundtrack for basketball simulation game NBA 2K15 which was released on October, 2014 in North America.

Track listing

Charts

Weekly charts

Year-end charts

Certification

Release history

References

External links

The Strokes songs
2011 singles
Songs written by Julian Casablancas
Songs written by Nikolai Fraiture
Songs written by Fabrizio Moretti
Songs written by Nick Valensi
Songs written by Albert Hammond Jr.
2011 songs
Rough Trade Records singles
RCA Records singles
Music videos directed by Warren Fu